ACG Schools (formerly known as ACG Education) is a New Zealand-based private education company that operates schools and preschools in New Zealand and Asia.  Incorporated as a New Zealand Limited Liability Company in 1994 it established its first school in 1994; and now ACG Schools delivers education to over 4,700 students in three countries through its 10 campuses located in 4 cities. It is New Zealand's largest independent private schools group. It was acquired by Inspired Education Group in 2019 for an undisclosed sum.

History
Sir John Graham and Dawn Jones established Senior College of New Zealand, New Zealand's first school for senior students, in 1995. This was the founding school of the ACG group, which now comprises independent schools and vocational colleges around New Zealand.  In February 2013, Waterman Capital took a 24% shareholding in ACG, and executive director of Waterman Capital Matt Riley joined the Board. Waterman was among the shareholders who agreed to sell ACG to Pacific Equity Partners. In May 2015, the National Business Review released a statement that ACG had appointed UBS and Macquarie to run the sale process. On 17 September 2015, Pacific Equity Partners announced they had agreed to acquire ACG for an undisclosed sum. In April 2017, ACG Education announced their purchase of English language school, The Campbell Institute. On 1 July 2017 ACG Education purchased Intueri Education Group's seven New Zealand vocational colleges.

Schools

New Zealand Independent Schools    
ACG has four independent schools in New Zealand. Three are in Auckland—ACG Parnell College, ACG Strathallan, and ACG Sunderland and one, ACG Tauranga, is in Tauranga. The schools are secular and co-ed and teach Cambridge International Examinations. ACG Parnell College also offers the International Baccalaureate.

ACG also has one preschool centre in Queenstown, Zig Zag Zoo.

In 2018 ACG Senior College was closed and set to merge with ACG Parnell College. In 2019 ACG Parnell College opened its Senior Campus for year 12 and 13 students enrolled in the college.

International Schools 
 Australia International School Vietnam
 ACG School Jakarta

Awards

See also
For-profit education
Wentworth College
Kristin School

References

Additional sources
 Private school prepares to triple its roll – Education – NZ Herald News

External links
 Academic Colleges Group

Education companies of New Zealand
Education companies established in 1994
New Zealand companies established in 1994